Ali Khalil, also known as Ali-Sultan , was the khan (r.1339-1342) of the Chagatai Khanate. He was a descendant of Qadan, son of the second Great Khan Ögedei.

'Ali attacked the ordo (palace) of Yesun Temur and usurped the throne. He was the first and last one who had restored the Ögedeid authority over the Chagatai Khanate since the reigns of Kaidu and his son Chapar. During his reign, Islam fully absorbed the Chagatai Mongols and 'Ali persecuted non-Muslim religions. He is the one who ordered the killing of six Franciscan monks at Almalik in 1339, as depicted in The Martyrdom of the Franciscans, by Ambrogio Lorenzetti.

References 

 Ц.Энхчимэг - "Монголын цагаадайн улс" 2006 он
 THE SHAJRAT UL ATRAK,OR GENEALOGICAL TREE OF THE TURKS AND TATARS; TRANSLATED AND ABRIDGED translated by Col. Miles.

Chagatai khans
Mongol Empire Muslims
14th-century monarchs in Asia
Year of birth unknown
Place of birth unknown
Year of death unknown
Place of death unknown